Tanner Ross Scheppers (born January 17, 1987) is an American former professional baseball pitcher. He has played in Major League Baseball (MLB) for the Texas Rangers and in Nippon Professional Baseball for the Chiba Lotte Marines. Prior to playing professionally, he played college baseball at Fresno State.

Amateur career
Scheppers played shortstop at Dana Hills High School in Dana Point, California.  When his high school team experienced a shortage of pitchers, Scheppers was pressed into action as a pitcher. The Baltimore Orioles drafted Scheppers in the 29th round of the 2005 Major League Baseball Draft, but he opted to attend California State University, Fresno to play for the Fresno State Bulldogs instead. Fresno State recruited Scheppers as a shortstop, but used him as a pitcher.

In 2008, his junior year, Scheppers had an 8–2 win–loss record with a 2.93 earned run average and 109 strikeouts in  innings pitched, and was named the Western Athletic Conference Pitcher of the Year. Fresno State won the 2008 College World Series, though Scheppers did not play in the tournament due to an injured rotator cuff and labrum in his shoulder.

Professional career
Due to the shoulder injury, Scheppers fell in the 2008 Major League Baseball Draft to the second round, with the 48th overall selection, where he was selected by the Pittsburgh Pirates. The Pirates offered Scheppers less money than he was hoping for, and he opted not to sign with the Pirates.

St. Paul Saints
Scheppers signed with the St. Paul Saints of the American Association of Independent Professional Baseball for the 2009 season.

Texas Rangers

Scheppers was chosen in the supplementary first round, with the 44th overall selection, of the 2009 Major League Baseball Draft by the Texas Rangers.  Teams passed on him again due to injury concerns, as some believed he had a partially torn labrum, which would require surgery. Scheppers also was the pitching coach for the junior varsity baseball team at Trabuco Hills High School in Mission Viejo, California, for the 2009 season.

On September 17, 2009, Scheppers signed with the Texas Rangers to a minor league deal. Scheppers was selected to represent the United States in the All-Star Futures Game in 2010.

On June 7, 2012, Scheppers was called up to the majors when Derek Holland was placed on the 15-day disabled list. On the same day, he made his Major League debut for the Texas Rangers in relief of Yu Darvish, and gave up a solo home run and struck out 2 in  innings in a 7–1 loss to the Oakland Athletics. Scheppers picked up his first win on August 16, 2012, when the Rangers defeated the New York Yankees. In 2013, Scheppers made 76 relief appearances for the Rangers, tied for the third-most in the American League.

In 2013 Scheppers reported that he was randomly assaulted and "sucker punched" in Cleveland while walking back to the team hotel after dinner. Reports later emerged which indicated that he been in a bar fight and was using the random assault story as a cover. 

The Rangers named Scheppers their Opening Day starting pitcher in 2014. However, he experienced right elbow inflammation and went on the disabled list in April, after making four starts. He returned to the Rangers in June as a relief pitcher, and returned to the disabled list with elbow inflammation after making four appearances. Scheppers missed the last two months of the 2015 season with a bone bruise in his left knee.

Scheppers was diagnosed with torn cartilage in his left knee before the 2016 season, and required surgery, which kept him out until September. He had his contract purchased on June 19, 2017. He was returned to the minor leagues on July 2, 2017.

Scheppers left the Rangers organization in October 2017, becoming a minor league free agent.

Chiba Lotte Marines 
On January 15, 2018, he signed with the Chiba Lotte Marines of Nippon Professional Baseball.

Long Island Ducks 
On May 27, 2019, Scheppers signed with the Long Island Ducks of the Atlantic League of Professional Baseball. He was released on June 22, 2019.

Scheppers announced his retirement via Instagram on October 24, 2019.

See also

List of Texas Rangers Opening Day starting pitchers

References

External links

Fresno State Player Bio: Tanner Scheppers
St. Paul Saints Bio
Official player page
NPB.com

1987 births
Living people
American expatriate baseball players in Japan
Baseball players from California
Chiba Lotte Marines players
Fresno State Bulldogs baseball players
Frisco RoughRiders players
Long Island Ducks players
Major League Baseball pitchers
Navegantes del Magallanes players
American expatriate baseball players in Venezuela
Nippon Professional Baseball pitchers
Oklahoma City RedHawks players
Round Rock Express players
Sportspeople from Mission Viejo, California
St. Paul Saints players
Surprise Rafters players
Texas Rangers players